Kneževi Vinogradi is a village and municipality in Croatia. It is situated in the Osijek-Baranja County, on the southern slopes of Bansko Brdo, 11 km southeast of Beli Manastir. Its elevation is 103 m. Chief occupations of villagers include farming, viticulture, livestock breeding (dairy farms) and dairy industry. At the time of 2011 census Kneževi Vinogradi was the only municipality in Croatia with a relative majority of Hungarians of Croatia.

Name

The name of the village derived from Croatian words "knez" ("prince" in English) and "vinograd" ("vineyard" in English), hence the meaning of the name is "the prince's vineyards". The name of the village in Serbo-Croatian is plural.

In other languages, the village in German is known as Weingärten or Weingärten i.d.Braunau, in Hungarian as Hercegszöllős (earlier Herczeg-Szöllős) and in Serbian as Kneževi Vinogradi (Кнежеви Виногради).

Geography

The municipality of Kneževi Vinogradi include following settlements:
Kneževi Vinogradi
Jasenovac
Kamenac
Karanac
Kotlina
Mirkovac
Sokolovac
Suza
Zmajevac

Features

Kneževi Vinogradi is underdeveloped municipality which is statistically classified as the First Category Area of Special State Concern by the Government of Croatia.

Demographics

Municipality

According to the 2001 census, there are 5,186 inhabitants in the municipality, including:
Hungarians (40.9%)
Croats (34.34%)
Serbs (18.43%)
Germans (1.95%)
others (including Romani, Albanians, Macedonians, Slovenes, etc.).

Village
According to the 2001 census, there are 1,715 inhabitants in the Kneževi Vinogradi village, including: 
Croats = 844
Serbs = 535
Hungarians = 275
others = 61

See also
Osijek-Baranja County
Baranja
List of Croatian municipalities with minority languages in official use

References

External links

Official website